The Ashvale is a chain of fish and chip restaurants and takeaways in the north-east of Scotland.

The main restaurant, which opened in 1979, is on Great Western Road in Aberdeen. There are other restaurants and takeaways in Banchory, Portlethen, Brechin, Dundee, Elgin, Ellon and Inverurie. By the mid-1990s the restaurant complex in Aberdeen had 300 seats and was open 7 days a week. In 2004, the chain served about 30,000 customers each week, selling approximately 18,000 fillets of fish.

Its successful strategy is to buy fish of the best quality but to sell it at the same price as the competition.  Its margins are therefore lower but it makes up for this with high volume, staying open from noon to 1 am, seven days a week, and being fairly busy throughout.

Awards
The Ashvale won a few awards in the 1990s before it retired from competing:
 Scotland's Fish and Chip Shop of the Year 1989/1990
 Scotland's Fish and Chip Shop of the Year 1990/1991
 Scotland's Fish and Chip Shop of the Year 1993/1994
 UK's Fish and Chip Shop of the Year 1990/1991
 UK Enterprise Award 1989/1990
 UK Enterprise Award 1990/1991
 UK Enterprise Award 1996/1997
The operations director, Stuart Devine, supports the Royal National Mission to Deep Sea Fishermen and was awarded an MBE for his services to the seafood industry.

The Whale
The Ashvale's most famous dish is The Ashvale Whale which is a 1lb haddock fillet.  To those who successfully complete the challenge of eating a Whale, a certificate is awarded, a commemorative mug may be purchased and another "Whale", or alternatively a dessert, is offered free of charge.

Celebrities
The Aberdeen restaurant has had many celebrity customers including:

 Annie Lennox, and Denis Law, who were born in Aberdeen
 Elaine C. Smith, who would travel there especially with her mother
 Gregor Fisher, who ate there regularly and whose son was employed by the business when studying at Aberdeen university
 John Major, whose order of a hundred fish suppers was intercepted by police security at the Aberdeen Exhibition and Conference Centre
 Mel Gibson, who ate there while filming Hamlet in 1990
 Paul Daniels and Debbie McGee, who arrived in a bright-red Rolls-Royce
 Numerous footballers and staff associated with Aberdeen FC, including Liam Brady, Kenny Dalglish, Graeme Souness and Barry Robson.
 Other celebrities including Lewis Capaldi, Buff Hardie, Sir Elton John, Gerard Kelly, Su Pollard, Sir Rod Stewart, and Ralph Steadman

In 2010, the Scottish Seafood Training Association used the Aberdeen restaurant as a location for a dinner to celebrate the 150th anniversary of the fish supper.

See also
 List of seafood restaurants

References

External links
Official website

1979 establishments in Scotland
Companies based in Aberdeen
Fish and chip restaurants
Restaurants established in 1979
Restaurants in Scotland
Scottish restaurants